El Camino Real Charter High School (also known locally as "ECR" or "Elco") is an independent charter secondary school located in the Woodland Hills district of the San Fernando Valley region of the city of Los Angeles, California, United States. The school, founded in 1969, was designed to emulate a small college campus, with a large central "quad" and an open campus policy.

ECR serves portions of Woodland Hills and West Hills and also maintains a sizable "traveling" student population from other areas of the district.

ECR's Academic Performance Index was 832 out of 1,000 in 2012.

On March 31, 2009, El Camino Real High School became a California Distinguished School. In December 2010, the teachers and staff at the school voted for it to become a charter school. This change took effect in the fall of 2011.

Demographics
In 1998, the school had 3,315 students enrolled. 5% were African American, 1% American Indian, 15% Asian, 42% White, 29% Latino, 6% Two or more races, 5% English learners, 7% special education students, 43% gifted and talented, 22% economically disadvantaged, and 15% students moving in and out of this school during the year. Over 1,000 of them, as of 1998, were classified as "gifted and talented". Several area parents disliked the LAUSD magnet program points admission system, so they chose to instead move to the ECR attendance zone and enroll their gifted-classified children there.

As of 1998, 70% of ECR graduates went on to colleges and universities, compared to 52% overall for LAUSD.

Academic competitions

Academic Decathlon team
The school's Academic Decathlon team won national titles in 1998, 2001, 2004, 2005, 2007, 2010, 2014, and 2018.

Junior Engineering Technical Society
The Junior Engineering Technical Society (JETS) promotes interest in engineering, science, math and technology in high school students and provides them with real-world engineering teamwork and problem-solving experiences. The team participates in the TEAMS (Test of Engineering Aptitude, Mathematics, and Science) Competition that occurs annually in March and is hosted and sponsored by the Viterbi School of Engineering at the University of Southern California (USC).

 In 2006, the ECR JETS Team won second place at the Southern California Regional Varsity Competition, losing first place to Beverly Hills High School by one point.
 In 2007, the ECR JETS Team again won second place at the Southern California Regional Varsity Competition, increasing their score significantly by 7 points but once again losing first place to Beverly Hills High School by only one point.
 In 2008, the ECR JETS Team won first place at the Southern California Regional Varsity Competition, defeating rival Beverly Hills High School. El Camino Real also placed second in the state of California, and advanced to the nationals.
 In 2009, the ECR JETS Team tied second place with another high school at their division. However, the team only received the trophy of the third place because of a random tiebreaker.
 In 2010, the ECR JETS Team placed first in Regionals and progressed to Nationals.

Notable alumni

 Jamal Anderson – former NFL All-Pro, running back, Atlanta Falcons 
 Mark Balderas – keyboardist, Human Drama
 Maggie Bandur – writer/producer; Malcolm in the Middle 
 Orr Barouch – professional soccer player, formerly of the Chicago Fire 
 Paul Beatty – poet/author; first American to win the Mann/Booker Prize in literature for his 2016 novel, The Sellout
 David Becker – jazz guitarist and composer
 Jay Bentley – bassist, Bad Religion
 Kurt Birkins – former Major League Baseball player, Baltimore Orioles, Tampa Bay Rays
 Alisha Boe – actress, 13 Reasons Why
 America Ferrera – award-winning actress; Ugly Betty, The Sisterhood of the Traveling Pants
 Sky Ferreira – singer/songwriter
 Jennifer Flavin – model
 Blake Gailen – American-Israeli baseball player
 Brad Garrett – actor; Everybody Loves Raymond, 'Til Death
 Marc Germain – radio talk show host
 Greg Graffin – vocalist, Bad Religion; university lecturer 
 Noah Grossman – cast member of Smosh
 Brett Gurewitz – guitarist, Bad Religion; founder of Epitaph Records
 Tiffany Haddish – comedian, actress 
 Jesse James Hollywood – convicted murderer portrayed by Emile Hirsch in the movie Alpha Dog
 Conor Jackson – former Major League Baseball left fielder/first baseman 
 Nathan Kahane – executive producer; Oldboy, Last Vegas
 Allan Kennedy – former NFL player, San Francisco 49ers
 Christopher Knight – actor; Brady Bunch, My Fair Brady
 Sammi Kane Kraft – actress, Bad News Bears
 Ryan Lavarnway – American-Israeli Major League Baseball catcher 
 Christy Lemire – film critic
 Amber Liu – singer, member of South Korean girl group f(x) 
 Ryan McGuire – former Major League Baseball player
 Alex Mejia – MLB player for the St. Louis Cardinals
 Joel A. Miller - author; Memoir of a Roadie
 Christopher Mintz-Plasse – actor; Superbad, Role Models, Kick-Ass
 Janel Moloney – actress; Donna Moss in The West Wing
 Angelo Moore – lead singer and multi-instrumentalist for Fishbone
 Troy Nolan – NFL football player, safety
 David Oppenheim – professional poker player
 Sara Paxton – actress, model
 Elston Ridgle – NFL player, actor (Independence Day, Legion)
 Sam Sarpong – actor, model, TV host; Tommy Hillfiger, Yo Mamma
 Mark Saul – actor/musician; Grey's Anatomy, All That, The Social Network
 Eli Schenkel (born 1992) -  Canadian Olympic fencer
 Mark Schulman – drummer
 Jonathan Shapiro (writer) – writer/producer; former Assistant U.S. Attorney
 Ramona Shelburne (born 1979) - sportswriter and softball player
 Glen Sobel – drummer, Alice Cooper
 Tim Talman – actor
 Dave Walsh – former Major League Baseball player, Los Angeles Dodgers 
 Jim Wolf – Major League Baseball umpire  
 Randy Wolf – former Major League Baseball pitcher 
 William Zabka – actor, The Karate Kid

References

External links

 
 LAUSD board report on charter conversion (Archive)

High schools in the San Fernando Valley
High schools in Los Angeles
Charter high schools in California
Los Angeles Unified School District schools
Educational institutions established in 1969
1969 establishments in California
Woodland Hills, Los Angeles
West Hills, Los Angeles